Osvaldo Sosa (26 January 1945 – 6 July 2020) was an Argentine football manager and player who worked as the manager of Atlético Tucumán in the Primera División Argentina.

Playing career
Sosa began his playing career in 1964 with Almagro. In 1966 he joined Primera División side Argentinos Juniors where he played over 100 games over his two stints with the club. He also played for Independiente and Ferro Carril Oeste.

Managerial career
Sosa had his first attempt at management as the player-coach of Argentinos Juniors between 1970 and 1971. He went on to manage the club another 5 times (1974, 1981, 1992–94, 1997-2000 and 2004-05). Sosa also returned to two of his other former clubs as manager, Almagro in 1980-81 and Independiente in 2003.

Some of Sosa's other clubs include two stints as manager of Mandiyú and single spells in charge of Tigre, Huracán, Colón, Deportivo Armenio, Racing Club, Talleres, Chacarita Juniors, Lanús, Quilmes and Atlético Tucumán.

References

External links

Osvaldo Sosa – Managerial statistics in the Primera División at Fútbol XXI 

1945 births
2020 deaths
Footballers from Buenos Aires
Argentine footballers
Association football midfielders
Club Almagro players
Argentinos Juniors footballers
Club Atlético Independiente footballers
Ferro Carril Oeste footballers
Argentine Primera División players
Argentine football managers
Argentinos Juniors managers
Almagro managers
Club Atlético Tigre managers
Club Atlético Huracán managers
Club Atlético Colón managers
Textil Mandiyú managers
Racing Club de Avellaneda managers
Talleres de Córdoba managers
Chacarita Juniors managers
Club Atlético Lanús managers
Club Atlético Independiente managers
Quilmes Atlético Club managers
Atlético Tucumán managers